Ruslan Grigorievich Skrynnikov (Руслан Григорьевич Скрынников; 8 January 1931, Kutaisi, Georgian SSR, – 16 June 2009, St. Petersburg, Russia) was a Russian historian who studied the reign of Ivan the Terrible. He later moved on to study the Time of Troubles.

For Skrynnikov, control over the bureaucratic apparatus (rather than the issue of centralization) was the primary point of contention explaining Muscovite political struggles of the 15th and 16th centuries. In the late 1960s he described Ivan's Oprichnina as the reign of terror designed to root out every possible challenge to the autocracy:

Skrynnikov' monographs about the Oprichinina and the Russian conquest of Siberia have been reprinted many times and translated into other major languages. He also authored the biographies of Ivan III, Ivan IV, and other Russian tsars.

References 

Soviet historians
Russian medievalists
Academic staff of Saint Petersburg State University
1931 births
2009 deaths
People from Kutaisi
20th-century Russian historians
Burials at Serafimovskoe Cemetery
Academic staff of Herzen University